"Canto della Terra" is an Italian song which was the second single from Italian pop tenor Andrea Bocelli's 1999 album, Sogno.  The song was written by composer Francesco Sartori and lyricist Lucio Quarantotto, the same writers of Bocelli's biggest hit "Con te partirò", and is among Bocelli's most popular and well-known songs.

Like "Con te partirò", the song was later recorded as a duet between Bocelli and Sarah Brightman, for her 2008 album Symphony. It was performed as a duet with Brightman at Andrea's "Live in Tuscany" Concert. The original version was also included in Bocelli's 2007 greatest hits album, The Best of Andrea Bocelli: Vivere.

In 2011, it was sung as a duet by Cheryl Baker of Bucks Fizz and The X Factor 2009 winner Joe McElderry on the second and final season of Popstar to Operastar. It was later recorded solo by McElderry for his second album Classic after winning the show.

Charts

Weekly charts

Year-end charts

References

External links
 "Canto della Terra", on Ultratop.be.

Andrea Bocelli songs
1999 singles
Songs written by Francesco Sartori
Songs written by Lucio Quarantotto
1999 songs
Decca Records singles